Events in the year 1875 in Argentina.

Incumbents
 President: Nicolás Avellaneda
 Vice President: Mariano Acosta

Governors
 Buenos Aires Province: Álvaro Barros (until 1 May); Carlos Casares (from 1 May)
 Cordoba: Enrique Rodríguez 
 Mendoza Province: Francisco Civit
 Santa Fe Province: Servando Bayo

Vice Governors
 Buenos Aires Province: vacant (until 1 May); Luis Sáenz Peña (starting 1 May)

Events
March 9 - The settlement of Deán Funes, Córdoba, is founded, when the Deán Funes, Córdoba when the Ferrocarril Central Norte (railway) from Córdoba reaches the area.
September 29 - The Casa de Moneda de la República Argentina is inaugurated, under Law 733 of 1875 which ordered the creation of two mints, one in Buenos Aires and another in Salta.

Births
February 17 - Rómulo Sebastián Naón, lawyer, politician and diplomat, Ambassador to the United States 1910-1919 (died 1941)
February 27 - Manuel Ugarte, author, writer and member of the Socialist Party (died 1951)

Deaths
June 30 - Dalmacio Vélez Sársfield, lawyer and politician (born 1800)
November 17 - Hilario Ascasubi, poet (born 1807)

References

 
1870s in Argentina
History of Argentina (1852–1880)
Years of the 19th century in Argentina